Joan Horvath is an American aeronautical engineer, writer, and entrepreneur. She worked at the Jet Propulsion Laboratory for sixteen years, in the technology transfer office and on the Magellan and TOPEX/Poseidon flight projects.

She served as CEO of the now-defunct Takeoff Technologies, and is a cofounder of a 3D printing company, Nonscriptum LLC.

Selected works

References

American science writers
American people of Hungarian descent
Living people
Year of birth missing (living people)
21st-century American women writers
American women non-fiction writers
21st-century American non-fiction writers